Paedocypris micromegethes is a species of cyprinid fish endemic to Sarawak in East Malaysia, where it is found in peat swamps.  It is one of the smallest vertebrates in the world, with females reaching a maximum size of 11.6 mm.

References

Paedocypris
Cyprinid fish of Asia
Fish of Malaysia
Taxa named by Maurice Kottelat
Fish described in 2006